The 1999 Guardian Direct Cup was a men's tennis tournament played on indoor Carpet court at the Battersea Park in London, Great Britain, that was part of the Championship Series of the 1999 ATP Tour. It was the 22nd edition of the tournament, the second one held in London, England, and was held from 22 February until 28 February 1999. Fifth-seeded Richard Krajicek won the singles title.

Finals

Singles

 Richard Krajicek defeated  Greg Rusedski, 7–6(8–6), 6–7(5–7), 7–5
 It was Krajicek's 1st singles title of the year and the 16th of his career.

Doubles

 Tim Henman /  Greg Rusedski defeated  Byron Black /  Wayne Ferreira, 6–3, 7–6(8–6)

References

Guardian Direct Cup
Milan Indoor
Guardian Direct Cup
Guardian Direct Cup
Guardian Direct Cup
Tennis in London
Tennis tournaments in England